German Black Pied cattle are a breed of dairy cattle that originated in the North Sea coast regions of northern Germany and the Netherlands.

Until the 18th century, cattle of diverse colours were bred in these regions. After 1750, the black pied coloured type was dominant, but there are still also unicoloured red and red pied cattle.

In 1878 in East Frisia (Germany), the first breeding company was founded. East Frisia and East Prussia (today Russia, Lithuania, and Poland) were the most important breeding regions of the breed. Later it extended over the whole of northern and central Germany. Since 1958 in West Germany the breed was crossed with Holstein Friesian cattle. Since the 1960s these crossed animals have been dominant, and so the German black-and-white cattle breed was born.

In East Germany the breed was crossed with Jersey cattle and Holstein Friesian cattle to create the German Black Pied Dairy cattle breed.

The original breeding type was conserved in East Germany as a genetic reserve. Individual breeders in West Germany and in the Netherlands were also able to conserve the original type.

German Black Pieds are smaller than Holstein Friesians and with a lower milk volume, but they are more fertile and long-lived. A comparison was made between the rates of muscle growth and energy utilisation of Fleckvieh bulls as compared to German black pied bulls. It was found that the Fleckvieh bulls had faster growth rates, the carcases had a smaller proportion of fat, especially abdominal fat, and the animals could be slaughtered at an earlier date when fed on similar diets.

References

Cattle breeds originating in Germany
Dairy cattle breeds
Cattle breeds